Quinigua is an extinct language that was spoken in northeastern Mexico. Quinigua was spoken between the Sierra Madre Oriental and the Sierra Tamaulipa la Nueva, and between the Rio Grande and the Rio del Pilón Grande. It has no apparent relatives and remains unclassified.

Classification
Gursky (1964) notes that Quinigua is highly different from its neighbors such as Coahuilteco, but observes some limited similarities with "Hokan-Coahuiltecan languages" such as Comecrudan and Yuman languages.

Vocabulary
A vocabulary list of Quinigua is documented in del Hoyo (1960). Gursky (1964) has selected and retranscribed some of del Hoyo's (1960) vocabulary, reproduced below.

{| class="wikitable sortable"
! gloss !! Quinigua
|-
| bean || mina
|-
| broad || patama
|-
| deep || sarak
|-
| deer || mau
|-
| dog || karama
|-
| duck || amakia
|-
| earth || ama
|-
| eat || ama, anama; ka(ene)
|-
| fish || ama, ami; ka
|-
| foot (of deer) || boi
|-
| forehead || niapin
|-
| go || wame, wan (?)
|-
| great || ya; ki
|-
| head || kai
|-
| hill || agu, ayu; imi
|-
| javali, hog || amoka
|-
| many || kai, ki
|-
| rabbit || kun
|-
| rain || paak
|-
| red (or black) || pan, pa
|-
| reed || aki, xi
|-
| rock || pixa
|-
| tail (of deer) || apino
|-
| thick || ta
|-
| tobacco || axo
|-
| tree || ana
|-
| water || ka, kwa, wa
|}

References

Unclassified languages of North America
Indigenous languages of Mexico
Extinct languages of North America